The Great Synagogue of Deventer is a synagogue in Deventer, Netherlands.

History

19th century
This temple was built in 1892 by J.A. Mulock Houwer. It is a Neo-Renaissance building with Moorish influences.
The structure includes minaret-like turrets, with crescents on either side. On the summit, just above the stone tablets with the Ten Commandments directly, was a large copper Star of David. The oriental style is a reference to the Taifa of Toledo, where, before 1492, peaceful and prosperous coexistence of Judaism with Islam and Christianity prevailed. The combination of crescents and a Star of David explicitly refers to the peaceful co-existence with Islam in Toledo.

20th century
During World War II, the interior was destroyed by Dutch Nazi's (members of the Dutch Nazi-party NSB).

Between 1951 and 2010 it was used as a place of worship by the Christian Reformed Church in the Netherlands.

21st century
From 2010 to 2018 the building in use as a synagogue by the Jewish community Beth Shoshanna. 

In February 2018 the Christian Reformed Church in the Netherlands sold the building, while rented out Congregation Beth Shoshanna, to Lenferink Groep Zwolle, the real estate firm of investors Carlus Lenferink and Geert-Harm van der Maat. A restaurant entrepreneur working with the firm, Ayhan Sahin, circulated plans to change the synagogue into a food hall. These food hall plans were met with strong objections.

References

Synagogues in the Netherlands
Buildings and structures in Deventer
Rijksmonuments in Overijssel
Synagogues destroyed by Nazi Germany
The Holocaust in the Netherlands
Renaissance Revival synagogues
Moorish Revival synagogues